Huanca District is one of twenty districts of the province Caylloma in Peru. 1450 people live in Huanca District to status data as June 30, 2015 .

See also 
 Ch'uwaña
 Yuraq Apachita

References

Districts of the Caylloma Province
Districts of the Arequipa Region